Azimuth Hill is a low rocky outcrop,  high, which extends to Prince Gustav Channel just south of the mouth of Russell East Glacier, Trinity Peninsula. So named by the Falkland Islands Dependencies Survey following a 1946 survey because a sun azimuth was obtained from a cairn built near the east end of the outcrop.

References
 

Hills of Trinity Peninsula